Brian David Baldinger (born January 7, 1959) is a former professional American football offensive lineman in the National Football League (NFL) for the Dallas Cowboys, Indianapolis Colts and Philadelphia Eagles. He covered Philadelphia Eagles preseason games as an analyst with Scott Graham for several years. He currently works for NFL Network, where he serves as an analyst for the television show NFL Total Access. He played college football at Duke University.

Early years
Baldinger was born in Pittsburgh, Pennsylvania. Always big, strong, and athletic for his age, Baldinger spent much of his youth playing a variety of sports in and around Cherry Hill, New Jersey.

His family later moved to Apple Valley, Minnesota, then Massapequa, New York where he and his brothers became well known locally as they continued to excel in sports. Brian played football, basketball and track at Massapequa High School, where his graduating class included Jessica Hahn, Brian Setzer, and Tim Van Patten.

College career
After high school, he initially enrolled at the Naval Academy, but later decided to transfer to Nassau Community College, where he became an All-Coastal Conference tight end and also practiced basketball.

In 1979, he transferred to Duke University, where he was converted into a guard because of his blocking ability. As a senior, he was voted the team's most improved player and started all 11 games.

Professional career

Dallas Cowboys
Baldinger was signed as an undrafted free agent by the Dallas Cowboys after the 1982 NFL Draft on April 30. As a rookie, he appeared in 4 out of 9 games, playing mostly on special teams. In 1983, he saw playing time as a backup at center and guard.

In 1984, he started two games at right tackle replacing an injured Phil Pozderac and also started 2 games at right guard in place of an injured Kurt Petersen. In 1985, he injured his right knee in the third preseason game against the Chicago Bears and was placed on the injured reserve list.

In 1986, he was a backup at center and also played as a third tight end in short-yardage situations. On September 2, 1987, he was placed on the injured reserve list with a left knee injury he suffered in a preseason game. On October 24, he was activated to the regular season roster. He was declared inactive in 6 of the final 8 games.

Baldinger wasn't re-signed after the season. During his time with the Cowboys, he played every offensive line position and also had a few snaps at tight end.

Indianapolis Colts
On July 19, 1988, he was signed as a free agent by the Indianapolis Colts, to provide depth in the case of a lengthy contract holdout by guard Ron Solt. He was the lightest member of the offensive line. He appeared in 16 games, starting three contests at right tackle. He caught his first career pass (37 yards) from a tackle-eligible position against the Green Bay Packers.

In 1989, he appeared in all 16 games. He started the season opener at right tackle in place of Kevin Call and started 2 games at left tackle in place of an injured Chris Hinton. He also was used as tackle-eligible in short yardage situations.

In 1990, he was named the starter at right guard for the first 8 games. In the second half of the season, he was moved to replace right tackle Call, who injured his left shoulder in the eighth game against the New York Giants.

In 1991, he started 13 games at center in place of Ray Donaldson, who was lost for the season with a broken leg he suffered against the Los Angeles Raiders.

Buffalo Bills
On April 2, 1992, he was signed in Plan B free agency by the Buffalo Bills, joining his brother Gary Baldinger. He was released on August 31.

Philadelphia Eagles
On September 28, 1992, he was signed as a free agent by the Philadelphia Eagles to replace an injured John Hudson. In 1993, he started 4 games at right guard in place of an injured Eric Floyd. On June 4, 1994, he was released in a salary cap move, along with 11 other veterans.

Broadcasting career
Baldinger began his broadcasting career as a color analyst at Bucknell University in 1995, then moved to Fox in 1997, providing analysis for NFL Europe games.  The network was impressed with his soothing voice and handy repertoire of clichés, and promoted him to a color commentary slot for NFL games.  Baldinger worked alongside play-by-play voices Ray Bentley, Curt Menefee, Joe Buck, Pat Summerall, Kenny Albert, and Dick Stockton.

In May 2009, it was reported that Baldinger would be replaced by former NFL safety John Lynch on Fox's telecasts. Shortly thereafter, Baldinger was hired by Compass Media Networks to serve as lead analyst for their national radio broadcasts of select Sunday afternoon NFL games.

Baldinger also co-hosts a talk show for Sporting News Radio during football season, and teaches seminars for Nadia Communications.  He is the author of the book The Map to Clear Messages. Baldinger has previously co-hosted various radio shows, and now is a frequent contributor for a sports-talk radio show for Philadelphia's WPEN, as well as NFL Network and Sky Sports.

In October 2016, during an appearance on WPEN ahead of a Sunday Night Game between the Eagles and Cowboys, Baldinger said that the Eagles should put a bounty on then-rookie running back Ezekiel Elliott. A few days later, NFL Network suspended Baldinger without pay for 6 months, but later reduced his suspension and he returned to NFLN in April 2017.

Personal life
A resident of Marlton, New Jersey, he has two younger brothers, Rich and Gary, who also played in the National Football League. He has a slightly mutilated right pinky finger that was injured when it became entangled in the jersey of Randy White.

References

1959 births
Living people
American football offensive guards
American football offensive tackles
Players of American football from Pennsylvania
People from Cherry Hill, New Jersey
People from Evesham Township, New Jersey
Sportspeople from the Delaware Valley
People from Apple Valley, Minnesota
People from Massapequa, New York
American sports radio personalities
Nassau Lions football players
Duke Blue Devils football players
Dallas Cowboys players
Indianapolis Colts players
Philadelphia Eagles players
National Football League announcers
NFL Europe broadcasters
College football announcers
Philadelphia Eagles announcers
Atlanta Falcons announcers
Nassau Community College alumni
Massapequa High School alumni
Ed Block Courage Award recipients